Typhlina is a taxonomic synonym that may refer to:

 Ramphotyphlops, also known as long tailed blindsnakes, a genus of harmless snakes found in southern and southeast Asia and Australia, with one species inhabiting the Americas, as well as many islands in the southern Pacific Ocean.
 Leptotyphlops, also known as slender blind snakes, a genus of harmless snakes found throughout North and South America, Africa and southwestern Asia.